General Mission Analysis Tool (GMAT) is open-source space mission analysis software developed by NASA and private industry.

It has been used for several missions, including LCROSS, the Lunar Reconnaissance Orbiter, OSIRIS-REx, the Magnetospheric Multiscale Mission, and the Transiting Exoplanet Survey Satellite (TESS) mission.

GMAT is an open-source alternative to software like Systems Tool Kit and FreeFlyer.

References

External links
 GMAT Wiki
 GMAT Download (SourceForge)
 GMAT channel on YouTube

Aerospace engineering
3D graphics software
Astronomy software
Mathematical software
Physics software